The Maltese National Badminton Championships is a tournament organized to crown the best badminton players in Malta. They are held since 1953.

Past winners

References
Badminton Europe - Details of affiliated national organisations

Badminton in Malta
National badminton championships
Sports competitions in Malta
Recurring sporting events established in 1953